Egon Neumann (21 July 1894 – 1948) was an Austrian composer and Kapellmeister.

Life 
Born in Mödling, Austria-Hungary, Neumann, whose father was a lawyer, studied musicology at the University of Vienna with Guido Adler from 1913. (Dr. phil. 1919), then worked as a bandmaster at the Moravian Ostrava in 1920, at the Neues Operettenhaus Berlin in 1921, at the Central Theater Berlin in 1922, and was an entertainers' composer. From 1920 to 1928, at the Bürgertheater as Kapellmeister, where he conducted the premiere of his operetta Donauweibchen. He later lived in Berlin, 1932–1934 again in Vienna, then in Paris. On New Year's Eve 1939/1940 he took part in the revue Meslay lacht wieder organised by Karl Farkas. He fled to Mexico via France in 1938. The diplomat Gilberto Bosques helped him.

Like Marcel Rubin, he was an active member of the ARAM (Acción Republikana Austriaca de Méxiko), an independent movement of Austrians Abroad.

Neumann committed suicide in Mexico City.

References

Further reading 
 Monika Kornberger: Neumann, Egon. In Oesterreichisches Musiklexikon. Online edition, Vienna 2002 ff., ; Print edition: Vol. 3, Österreichischen Akademie der Wissenschaften press, Vienna 2004, 
Vol. 2. Biographisches Lexikon der Theaterkünstler. Munich: Saur, 1999, pp. 699f.

External links 
 

20th-century Austrian composers
20th-century Austrian male musicians
Austrian choral conductors
University of Vienna alumni
Jewish emigrants from Nazi Germany
1894 births
1948 deaths
People from Mödling District
Artists who committed suicide